The World Citizenship Award is an award of the World Association of Girl Guides and Girl Scouts (WAGGGS). Launched in 1996, the award is given to people outside the Girl Guiding and Girl Scouting movement who have contributed to a better world in at least one of the following areas - peace, environment, education, food and nutrition, health, and culture and heritage.

Recipients
As of 2012, the award has been presented to 13 recipients:
 1996 - Nelson Mandela
 1997 - Mary Robinson
 1999 - Mo Mowlam
 1999 - Ian Kiernan
 2001 - Corazon Aquino
 2001 - Archbishop Desmond Tutu
 2002 - Catherine Bertini
 2002 - Dr Nafis Sadik
 2004 - Stanislav Petrov
 2005 - Princess Basma bint al-Talal of Jordan
 2005 - Sadako Ogata
 2007 - Stephen Lewis
 2007 - Wangari Maathai
 2008 - Graça Machel

References

Girl Guiding and Girl Scouting
Scout and Guide awards
World Association of Girl Guides and Girl Scouts
Awards established in 1996